Don Filippo Caracciolo, 8th Prince of Castagneto, 3rd Duke of Melito (4 March 1903 – 16 July 1965), was an Italian nobleman and politician.

Biography 
Caracciolo was the 8th Prince of Castagneto, the 3rd Duke of Melito, and an hereditary Patrician of Naples from an old noble Neapolitan family dating back to the Kingdom of Naples. He graduated in political and commercial sciences and in 1934 assumed diplomatic positions in Turkey, Switzerland, and Strasbourg. He took part in the Italian resistance movement, and hosted exiled anti-fascists, including Ugo La Malfa. During the Bari congress in 1944, he became the executive secretary of the National Liberation Committee, and later became the undersecretary of the Italian Ministry of Foreign Affairs in the Second Badoglio government. During this time, he helped overcome objections for the Italian Communist Party to join the government. Caracciolo later became secretary for the Action Party, and from 1949 to 1954 was general-secretary of the Council of Europe.

Family 
Caracciolo married Margaret Clarke (1898–1955) of Peoria, Illinois, the heiress of a well-known family of whiskey producers; they had three children: Carlo Caracciolo (1925–2008) who went on to found the Gruppo Editoriale L'Espresso, Marella Agnelli (1927–2019) who became an art collector, socialite, style icon, and wife of Fiat S.p.A. chairman Gianni Agnelli, and Nicola Caracciolo (1931–2020), who went on to become a journalist.

References

Further reading

External links 
 Filippo Caracciolo at Filippo Caracciolo Foundation (in Italian)
 Congresso di Bari at La Gazzetta del Mezzogiorno (in Italian)
 Vera Lombardi Fondo: Schiano Pasquale Serie: Dopoguerra corrispondenza anche di Caracciolo at Campani Institute for the History of the Resistance (in Italian)

1903 births
1963 deaths
20th-century Italian politicians
Filippo
Italian anti-fascists
Italian nobility